Kawato may refer to:
, Japanese professional footballer on SC Sagamihara (born 1994)
, Japanese professional wrestler (born 1997)
Kawato Station, railway station in Izumo, Shimane

See also
Kwato (disambiguation)

Japanese-language surnames